The Canadian cricket team toured Scotland in 2009. They played two One Day Internationals and an Intercontinental Cup match against Scotland.

Intercontinental Cup Match

ODI series

1st ODI

2nd ODI

2009 in Scottish cricket
2009 in cricket
Canadian cricket tours abroad
International cricket tours of Scotland
International cricket competitions in 2009
Canada–United Kingdom relations